Mo Dil To Deewana is an Oriya film released on 1 January 2013 in Odisha, India. This film is based on romantic love story directed by Alka Nanda.

Cast 
 Kajal
 Asrumochan Mohanty

References

2010s Odia-language films